Subhashis Nag (14 August 1955 – 22 December 1998) was an Indian mathematician who specialised in  complex analytic geometry, particularly Teichmüller theory, and its relations to string theory.

He won  the Shanti Swarup Bhatnagar Prize for Science and Technology in 1998, the highest science award in India,  in the mathematical sciences category. However, he died on 22 December 1998, before the actual award ceremony was held.

Books authored

References

1955 births
1998 deaths
Recipients of the Shanti Swarup Bhatnagar Award in Mathematical Science